Oliva polpasta radix  is a subspecies of the sea snail species Oliva polpasta, a marine gastropod mollusc in the family Olividae, the olives.

References

polpasta radix